Lithuania is a country in Northern Europe. Lithuania is a member of the European Union, the Council of Europe, a full member of the Eurozone, Schengen Agreement and NATO. It is also a member of the Nordic Investment Bank, and part of Nordic-Baltic cooperation of Northern European countries. The United Nations Human Development Index lists Lithuania as a "very high human development" country. Lithuania has been among the fastest growing economies in the European Union and is ranked 21st in the world in the Ease of Doing Business Index.

For further information on the types of business entities in this country and their abbreviations, see "Business entities in Lithuania".

Notable firms 
This list includes notable companies with primary headquarters located in the country. The industry and sector follow the Industry Classification Benchmark taxonomy. Organizations which have ceased operations are included and noted as defunct.

See also 
 Economy of Lithuania

References 

Lithuania
 
Companies